Aird may refer to:

People
Aird (surname), shared by several people

Places

Northern Ireland
Aird, County Antrim, a townland

Scotland
Aird, Dumfries and Galloway
Aird, Inverness, a district of the county of Inverness
Aird, Lewis (Aird An Rubha) in the Outer Hebrides
Aird Asaig, Harris in the Outer Hebrides
Aird of Kinloch, Mull in the Inner Hebrides
Aird of Sleat, Skye in the Inner Hebrides
An Aird, an area of Fort William, Scotland, and a shinty park